Vagococcus hydrophili is a Gram-positive, coccus-shaped and facultative anaerobic bacterium from the genus of Vagococcus which has been isolated from the intestine of the diving beetle Hydrophilus acuminatus.

References 

Lactobacillales
Bacteria described in 2020